Paddleton is a 2019 American comedy-drama film, directed by Alex Lehmann, from a script by Lehmann and Mark Duplass. The film stars Duplass and Ray Romano.

The film had its world premiere at the Sundance Film Festival on February 1, 2019. It was released on February 22, 2019, by Netflix to generally favorable reviews from critics.

Plot
Middle-aged Michael is diagnosed with terminal stomach cancer and decides to end his life. This upsets his upstairs neighbor Andy, as they are each other's best (and only) friends and help each other escape from their menial jobs.

Andy encourages Michael to fight the cancer, but Michael refuses to prolong any suffering. As per Michael's wishes, they make pizzas together, watch kung fu movies, solve jigsaw puzzles, and play Paddleton, a game of their own creation. Andy promises to finally tell Michael a rousing halftime speech that he has been working on in secret.

Andy is reluctant to help Michael end his own life, but agrees to join him on a road trip to the closest pharmacy that will fill the prescription, six hours away. During their drive, they discuss genie-in-a-bottle style wishes and stop to visit an ostrich farm on the way. They pick up Michael's prescription and check into a hotel, where they are mistaken for a gay couple. While Michael naps, Andy buys a mini safe where he puts the medication and withholds the combination.

They go to an open mic night, where a nervous Andy finally delivers his halftime speech to himself in the bathroom mirror before helping Michael perform a scene from their favorite kung fu movie onstage. They later break hotel rules, using a Jacuzzi after-hours while drinking. Caught by the hotel owner, she ends up joining them and flirting with Andy, leading Michael to go back to their room. Andy is uncomfortable as she mentions her deceased husband being "all around her."

Andy wakes up the next morning to find Michael and the safe missing. He panics, running all over, the looking for Michael, only to discover him in the hotel lobby, waiting to meet up for breakfast. Andy takes and attempts to keep hold of the safe, until an annoyed Michael forces him to face the fact that he is dying, and that Andy needs to respect his wishes.

They drive back home, where his condition quickly deteriorates. As they sit on the kitchen floor preparing the lethal dose of medicine, Michael reveals that he used to be married, but quickly felt uncomfortable within the marriage. In contrast, he felt an instant sense of belonging with Andy when they met. Andy replies that when he first saw Michael, he thought he was a serial killer in hiding. They discuss Andy's halftime speech (which Michael has already heard through the apartment's vents) and the possibility of an afterlife where Michael could visit Andy.

Ready to die, they deliver the lethal dose of medication. After a brief moment of fear, Michael dies peacefully in his own bed after they reaffirm their platonic love for each other, leaving Andy devastated. Andy tries to live his usual life of kung fu movies, puzzles, and Paddleton, but is lonely and unfulfilled. Some time later, Andy meets the single mother named Kiersten and her son Evan moving into Michael's old apartment. He reassures them that they have the best apartment in the complex and explains the game of Paddleton to Evan. Promising to give him a rousing halftime speech if he ever needs it, Andy returns to his own apartment with a smile.

Cast
 Mark Duplass as Michael Thompson, a man who has terminal cancer
 Ray Romano as Andy Freeman, Michael's neighbor and best friend
 Christine Woods as Doctor Hagen
 Kadeem Hardison as David
 Marguerite Moreau as Kiersten
 Dendrie Taylor as Nancy
 Alexandra Billings as Judy
 Matt Bush as Stewart
 Jack McGraw as Evan

Production
In February 2018, it was announced Alex Lehmann had directed a film, from a screenplay written by him and Mark Duplass. It stars Duplass and Ray Romano. Duplass and Jay Duplass are credited as executive producers under their Duplass Brothers Productions banner, while Mel Eslyn, Alana Carithers and Sean Bradley are credited as producers.

The script and resulting film were based on the lives of Rob Mermin and Bill Morancy. Their story was originally produced as a podcast episode in 2016 by Rumblestrip Vermont entitled "Last Chapter".

Release
It had its world premiere at the Sundance Film Festival on February 1, 2019. It was released on February 22, 2019.

Critical response
Its critical consensus reads, "It takes its time coming together, but the quietly effective Paddleton pulls off a tricky tonal balancing act, thanks largely to the strengths of its well-chosen leads." Metacritic, which uses a weighted average, assigned a score of 70 out of 100 based on 17 critics, indicating "generally favorable reviews."

Writing for RogerEbert.com, Monica Castillo gave the film 3.5 out of 4 stars, stating: "Paddleton is an appreciation of friendship for better or for worse, in sickness and in health. It’s about the way your best friend notices things about you that you may not know about yourself."

References

External links
  on Netflix
 

2019 films
2019 independent films
American independent films
American buddy comedy-drama films
American comedy-drama films
Duplass Brothers Productions films
Films about cancer
Films about death
Films about euthanasia
Films about suicide
English-language Netflix original films
2010s buddy comedy-drama films
2010s English-language films
2010s American films